Sardar Shah Nawaz (  11 January 1991; also known as S. Shahnawaz, was a Pakistani diplomat who served as the 14th foreign secretary of Pakistan from 1977 to 1980 and 9th permanent representative of Pakistan to the United Nations from 1982 to 1989.

He started his career when he joined the civil services of Pakistan in 1950. Prior to his appointment at the UN and foreign ministry, he served as ambassador of Pakistan to Iran from 1968 to 1972. He was later appointed as secretary-general of the Ministry of Foreign Affairs from 1980 to 1982.

He was suffering from cancer and was admitted to a hospital in New York on 11 January 1991. He died on the same day in hospital.

References

External links 
Shah Nawaz, S. at UN Digital Library

1910s births
1991 deaths
Place of birth missing
Permanent Representatives of Pakistan to the United Nations
Foreign Secretaries of Pakistan
Ambassadors of Pakistan to Iran